Clary is a census-designated place in Shenandoah County, in the U.S. state of Virginia.

References

Census-designated places in Shenandoah County, Virginia
Census-designated places in Virginia